The James R. Thompson Center (JRTC), originally the State of Illinois Center, is a postmodern-style civic building designed by architect Helmut Jahn, located at 100 W. Randolph Street in the Loop district of Chicago. It houses offices of the Illinois state government and serves as a secondary capitol for the State of Illinois in the most populated city and county of the state. Google purchased the building in 2022 and expects to move in 2026 after two years and $280 million of renovations.

History

The location was previously the site of the Sherman House Hotel operated by Ernie Byfield. The hotel closed in 1973 and demolished in 1980.

The building opened in May 1985 as the State of Illinois Center.  It was renamed in 1993 to honor former Illinois Republican Governor James R. Thompson (the former name remains in use interchangeably, along with the "State of Illinois Building").  The property occupies the entire block bound by Randolph, Lake, Clark and LaSalle Streets, one of the 35 full-size city blocks within Chicago's Loop. In front of the Thompson Center is a 1984 sculpture, Monument With Standing Beast, by Jean Dubuffet.

On February 13, 2018, Chicago Police Commander Paul Bauer was shot and killed, allegedly by Shomari Legghette, while Bauer was in pursuit of the suspect down a stairwell of the Thompson Center.

Design
The Thompson Center was designed by Helmut Jahn of Murphy/Jahn now called JAHN Architects. It opened to mixed reviews by critics, ranging from "outrageous" to "wonderful".  The color of the street-level panels were compared to tomato soup.  The 17-story, all-glass exterior curves and slopes facing a plaza on the southeast corner of the property. The design simultaneously looks forward with advanced architectural tectonics (of the time) and back to recapture the grandeur of large public spaces.  Visitors to the Thompson Center's interior can see all 17 floors layered partway around the building's immense skylit atrium.  The open-plan offices on each floor are supposed to carry the message of "an open government in action."

Originally, the design called for curved, insulated (double paned) glass panels, but these were found to be prohibitively expensive. Flat, insulated glass had been suggested, but was dismissed by Jahn. The building is also bitterly cold in the winter; in its early years, ice formed on the interior of some of the wall panels. The marble floor of the atrium initially developed unsightly water stains, an issue which has since been resolved.

Nearby transportation
The Clark/Lake 'L' station, the second busiest in the system, is housed between the Thompson Center and the 203 N. LaSalle building across the street.  Orange, Green, Blue, Pink, Purple and Brown Line trains stop at the center.  Three tunnels of the Chicago Pedway enter the building's food-court concourse, connecting from to 203 North LaSalle Street, the Chicago Title and Trust Company and Chicago City Hall.

Art
The sculpture at the front entrance by French artist Jean Dubuffet sets the tone for this building that houses a tremendous art collection.  The collection includes nineteen specially commissioned artworks funded by the State of Illinois Art-in-Architecture Program. The building also has over 150 of the state's 600 works collected under the Percent for Art program.  Under this program 0.5% of the money  designated for construction of state-funded public buildings is used for the purchase of art.  The Illinois Artisan's shop is also housed inside the building.

Proposed sale
When he first came to office, Illinois Governor Rod Blagojevich proposed selling the  building to assuage the state budget. The proposal was heavily criticized. Lawmakers at first agreed to the plan, but later a $200 million mortgage was agreed to instead, payable over 10 years. The plan was declared unconstitutional by Illinois Attorney General Lisa Madigan in June 2004. The plan was set aside, although it had already cost the state $532,000 in legal fees.

In 2015, and again in 2017, Governor Bruce Rauner also proposed selling the property, and a legislative committee to explore his request was announced by Democratic House Speaker Michael Madigan in February 2017, though it was effectively a non-starter under his administration due to his two-year state budget impasse, which itself led to more deferred maintenance in regards to the Thompson Center.

In 2016–2017, filmmaker and cultural heritage activist Nathan Eddy directed a short documentary film about Thompson Center – Starship Chicago. Architect Stanley Tigerman appears in the film.

In 2019, Illinois governor J. B. Pritzker signed a bill to begin the sale of the Thompson Center, with a proposed three-year timeline to find a buyer. This sparked activism from preservationists and architects concerned about the future of the building. In March 2022, Pritzker announced an agreement to sell the building to JRTC Holdings. The State of Illinois was to receive an initial payment of $70 million for the purchase of the property and would still retain  of office space. 

However, in August 2022, Pritzker announced a revised deal in which Alphabet would acquire the building for $105 million. Of this amount, $30 million would be a cash payment and the remainder would be used to purchase the Harris Bank Addition II which would be renovated to become the new home of state offices in Chicago.

Tenants
 Chicago district office of the Governor of Illinois (Suite 16-100)
 Illinois Court of Claims (Suite 10-400)
 Illinois House Republican Staff (Suite 16-700)
 Illinois State Board of Education (Suite 14-300)
 Chicago branch of the Illinois Attorney General (Floors 11-13)
 Chicago office of the Illinois Department of Financial and Professional Regulation (Floors 5 & 9)

In popular culture
The Thompson Center has been a filming location in several motion pictures, including 2000's The Watcher and 1990's The Kid Who Loved Christmas. The climax of 1986's Running Scared was filmed there. It also served as the exterior for Gotham Square Garden in 2022's The Batman, though interior shots were filmed at London's O2 Arena.

See also

 Chicago architecture
 Helmut Jahn

References

External links
 Commerce, Culture, & State Offices Under Glass
 Commerce, Culture, & State Offices Under Glass
 James R. Thompson Center
 New York Times Travel Guide Chicago James R. Thompson Center
 Emporis.com page
 Google Maps page

Government buildings in Chicago
Skyscraper office buildings in Chicago
State government buildings in the United States
Government buildings completed in 1985
Office buildings completed in 1985
1980s architecture in the United States
Helmut Jahn buildings
Postmodern architecture in the United States
1985 establishments in Illinois
Google
Alphabet Inc.